The Dangi  are an agricultural Hindu caste native to northern India. Their traditional occupation was farming. They speak several languages, but Hindi is the most commonly understood language among them.

References

Further reading 
 
 

Social groups of India
Indian castes
Social groups of Rajasthan
Social groups of Bihar
Social groups of Gujarat
Social groups of Madhya Pradesh
Social groups of Uttar Pradesh
Bundelkhand